Huttu Habbada Shubhashayagalu is a 2021 Indian Kannada crime-thriller film written by Prasanna and directed by Nagaraj Bethur, making his debut. The film is produced by TR Chandrashekhar under the banner Crystal Park Cinemas. It features Diganth and Kavitha Gowda in the lead roles. The supporting cast includes Madenur Manu, Sujay Shastri, and Ajay. The score and soundtrack for the film is by Sridhar V Sambhram and the cinematography is by Abhilash Kalathi.

Cast 

 Diganth as Arjun
 Kavitha Gowda as Ashika
 Madenuru Manu as Glucose
 Sujay Shastri as Siddarth Malhotra
 Rathan Ram as Vijay
 Ajay as Gaja
 Suraj as Ramesh
 Surya as Suresh
 Shanaya Katwe
 Sharanya Shetty
 Sridatta
 Srihari
 Amogha varsha

Production 
The film was started on 10 May 2019 by performing its muhurta in a temple at Bengaluru. The film had Diganth Manchale on board to play the lead character. Later the team had Kavitha Gowda as the female lead who was previously part of the banners two projects Gubbi Mele Brahamastra and Birbal Trilogy. This was her third collaboration with the production house. The filming took place simultaneously in the same month. The film was shot in and around Bengaluru mainly at a resort. The film was wrapped up on 31 January 2020.

Soundtrack 

The film's background score and the soundtracks are composed by Sridhar V Sambhram. The music rights were acquired by Crystal Music .

Release 
The first look of the film starring the lead was released on 28 October 2019 coinciding with the Deepavali festival. The film's teaser was released on 5 March 2021. The party song from the film was released on 10 December 2021. The trailer of the film was released on 23 December 2021. The trailer of the film was released by actor Upendra. The film was earlier slated to release in Summer 2021 but later owing to COVID-19 pandemic the release was further pushed to December 31, 2021.

References

External links 

 

2020s Kannada-language films
2021 crime thriller films
Indian crime thriller films
2021 directorial debut films
Films shot in Mysore
Films shot in Bangalore